General Walter Martin (December 15, 1764 – December 10, 1834) was the founder of Martinsburg, New York.

Walter Martin was born in Sturbridge, Massachusetts in 1764. He established the village of Martinsburg in 1803 on an 8000-acre tract he had purchased in Oneida County in northern New York. In 1805 when Lewis County was formed from part of Oneida County, Martin influenced the selection of Martinsburg as the county seat by donating land and money for a courthouse. Martin constructed a large stone mansion in Martinsburg.

References

1764 births
1834 deaths
People from Sturbridge, Massachusetts
People from Martinsburg, New York